Rony Oren (born in 1953) is an Israeli animator, claymator and academic. In the commercial world he is best known for more than 500 animated short films in clay and over 30 children books which he illustrates or both writes and illustrates.

Filmography
From his "Frame by Frame" independent studio, established in 1978, he has directed and animated over 500 short films and television series that depict the Clayground method. Based on plasticine figures, a number of his films have received international awards. Oren won the Nachum Gutman prize for illustration. Oren's short films were submitted by the Israeli Broadcasting Authority and selected for screening in the Radio and Television Museum in New York and Los Angeles.

Among the series he has produced are The Egg (25x25sec), Foxy Fables (13x7), Tales of a Wise King (26x6), and Grabbit the Rabbit (13x7). These titles have been broadcast in over 80 countries and on numerous networks including Channel One, IETV, and more. Usually director and animator, in 2009 he directed a team of 3 animators for the ClayPlay series (13x4).

In addition to the Secrets of Clay book series for all ages, Oren has produced over 30 books for children in Israel, Britain, France, Germany, Russia, Denmark, Italy, Greece and the United States. Rony Oren illustrated "The animated Haggadah", which was published almost 21 years ago and sold extensively all over the world.

Amongst the TV advertisements Oren has produced is a commercial for Bezeq Beinleumi featuring the well known talking parrot and a commercial for Tene Noga which featured talking cows.

Oren produced over 85 short films for "Rechov Sumsum" and "Shalom Sesame" (the Israeli versions of "Sesame Street").

Published works
Illustrated and Wrote:
 Rony's Clay Christmas (2012)
 The Nativity (2011)
 Secrets of Clay 3: Dinosaurs (2010)
 Secrets of Clay 2: Animals in the Wild (2006)
 Blue Bear Sweeter Than Honey (2006)
 Blue Bear Wants to Sleep (2007)
 The Book of Colors (2006)
 The Book of Numbers (2006)
 Secrets of Clay: Pets & Farm Animals (2005)

Illustratated:
 Plasticine Zoo, by Dror Green, Steimatzky (1987).
 Plasticine Vegetables, by Dror Green, Keter Publishing House (1987).
 Plasticine Zoo, by Dror Green, Keter Publishing House (1987).
 Plasticine Zoo, by Dror Green, Keter Publishing House (1987).

Animation
 Three Green Frogs (2003)
 Grabbit The Rabbit (1996)
 Happy Holidays (short film for Shalom Sesame, 1991)
 Pay Words (short film for Shalom Sesame, 1991)
 Here Is Your Life: Hanukkah (short film for Shalom Sesame, 1990)
 Tales of A Wise King (1989)
 Foxy Fables (1987)
 Excuse Me (short film for Shalom Sesame, 1986)
 Wet Paint (short film for Shalom Sesame, 1986)
 The Egg (1979)
 In The Beginning (1976) (short film)

Clayground brand
Rony's Clayground includes the Secrets of Clay how-to series, as well as a range of board books and story books, internationally broadcast short films and workshops. The Clayground philosophy is based on Oren's trademarked method of working with clay. All creatures, settings and scenes inhabiting Oren’s clay world can be built from three key shapes: Ball, Sausage and Pancake. These shapes provide the platform for all his clay figures, in any combination of color and size. Rony Oren has introduced his philosophy and method to children and students around the world through countless workshops and master classes. His workshops take place all over the world in schools, design schools, universities, children's hospitals and festivals.

Academic career
Oren is currently a Professor of Animation at Bezalel Academy of Art and Design in Jerusalem. Between the years 1980 - 2002 Oren taught animation at different art schools in Israel - Beit Tzvi, the WIZO Haifa Academy of Design and Education, and the Bezalel Academy of Art and Design. Oren also led art classes at different animation festivals. He leads stop motion master classes in various international art and film academies and festivals. Between 2000 and 2008 Oren served as Head of the Animation Department at the Bezalel Academy.

References

Living people
Stop motion animators
Clay animators
Israeli animators
Israeli animated film directors
Jewish artists
1953 births